Liberation Transmission is the third studio album by Welsh rock band Lostprophets, released on 26 June 2006 by Visible Noise.

Recording
This is the first Lostprophets album recorded without original drummer Mike Chiplin. Josh Freese drummed at the request of Bob Rock, but the band's first choice was Travis Barker. Ilan Rubin also played drums for the songs "Everybody's Screaming!!!" and "For All These Times Son, for All These Times".

Release
"Rooftops (A Liberation Broadcast)" was released to American radio on 16 May 2006. On 13 June, "For All These Times Son, For All These Times" was made available for streaming via the band's Myspace profile. On 25 June, the album was made available for streaming via Alternative Press, and was a day later through Columbia. From late August to mid October, the band went on a headlining tour of the US with support from Kill Hannah, the Rasmus and Eighteen Visions. "The New Transmission" was released to American radio on 3 October. Following this, they went on another US tour later in October and running into November. The band was supported by Take the Crown and the Transit War. In November and December, the band went on a brief UK tour with support from This Is Hell.

Critical reception

Initial critical response to Liberation Transmission was positive. At Metacritic the album received an average score of 73, based on 7 reviews. There were many positive reviews. NME said "Lostprophets are big and brash and brilliant. And this is rock'n'roll radio." Drowned in Sound said "While Liberation Transmission may be a lyrical vacuum, it is also a musical masterclass in how to create 12 tracks of killer with almost no filler." One of the mixed reviews was Entertainment Weekly who gave it a B− and said, "Around the world, 15-year-olds will fall for this band. Then they will turn 16 and move on", while Observer Music Monthly followed saying "Lyrically absurd, musically turbo-fueled."

It became the first Lostprophets album to enter the UK Albums Chart at number one (2 July for 1 week). The album peaked at No. 33 on the Billboard 200 album chart with 27,000 copies sold. By August 2006, the album had sold over 75,000 copies in the US. The album has gone Platinum in the UK and was the 94th best selling album of 2006, with sales over 210,000 units.

References to other songs
"Everybody's Screaming!" has the outro, "It's not over, not over, not over, not over yet", a reference to the song, "Not Over Yet" by dance act Grace. According to Ian Watkins at local music show The Full Ponty, this song was written about how the bandmates hated their jobs. They went going out dancing at a club in Pontypridd after a bad week at work, and "Not Over Yet" was a song that they'd dance to every week.

Track listing

Release history

Charts

Certifications

Personnel
Credits are adapted from the Liberation Transmission liner notes.

Lostprophets
 Ian Watkins – lead vocals
 Lee Gaze – lead guitar
 Mike Lewis – rhythm guitar
 Stuart Richardson – bass guitar
 Jamie Oliver – piano; keyboards; samples; vocals

Additional musicians
 Josh Freese – drums; percussion (tracks: 1–6, 8, 9, 11, 12)
 Ilan Rubin – drums; percussion (tracks: 7, 10)
 Sean Smith (credited as Sean Blackout) – additional vocals on "Everyday Combat"

Production
 Bob Rock – producer; engineer
 Eric Helmkamp – engineer
 Randy Staub – mixer
 Zach Blackstone – assistant engineer
 George Marino – mastering engineer

References

External links

Liberation Transmission at YouTube (streamed copy where licensed)
 

Lostprophets albums
2006 albums
Columbia Records albums
Albums produced by Bob Rock